Geraldo Eduardo Ribeiro Carneiro is a Brazilian poet, lyricist and screenwriter for television, theater and cinema. He was born in Belo Horizonte, Minas Gerais, on June 11, 1952. He began to express interest in art at a young age, influenced by the many writers and musicians who frequented the house of his parents, among them Paulo Mendes Campos, Jacob do Bandolim and Tom Jobim.

In 1968, he started a partnership with Minas Gerais musician Egberto Gismonti that lasted 12 years and yielded more than 60 songs. He also produced Gismonti's first album,  Água e vinho, released in 1972. Throughout his career, he has partnered with several other musicians, such as Argentine Astor Piazolla and Brazilians Tom Jobim, Wagner Tiso and Francis Hime.

Screen and stage work
On television, Geraldo Carneiro debuted in 1976, as a collaborator of the writer Bráulio Pedroso in the miniseries Parabéns pra você (Congratulations to you), directed by Roberto Talma and shown by Globo. Three years later, in 1985, he started working at TV Manchete. He returned to Globo in 1989, where he wrote scripts for specials, serials and soap operas. He shared with Walther Negrão the authorship of the miniseries O Sorriso do lagarto, adapted from the book by João Ubaldo Ribeiro and directed by Roberto Talma, in 1991. The following year, he wrote the script for Elas por ela, a musical starring Marília Pêra, with direction by Roberto Talma and musical direction by Gonzaguinha.

From 1993 to 1995, Carneiro was one of the screenwriters for the Terça Nobre e Brasil Especial, a series where adaptations of Brazilian literary works were presented. Among other episodes, he wrote Lucíola (1993), based on the novel by José de Alencar; Lúcia McCartney (1993), adapted from the short story by Rubem Fonseca, and A desinibida do Grajaú (1994), from an original story by Sérgio Porto. With João Ubaldo Ribeiro, he wrote O santo que não acreditava em Deus (1993), O poder da arte da palavra (1994) and A maldita (1995), adaptations of the Peruvian writer's short stories; and O compadre de Ogum (1994), based on a short story by Jorge Amado.

In cinema, he wrote the scripts for the films Eternamente Pagu (1987), by Norma Bengell, and O judeu (1996), written with Millôr Fernandes, Gilvan Pereira and director Jom Tob Azulay.

In the theater, he debuted with the musical Lola Moreno, written in partnership with Bráulio Pedroso, in 1979. He wrote, among other plays, Folias do Coração, Apenas bons amigos (both with Miguel Falabella), A bandeira dos cinco mil réis and Manu Çaruê. He also translated more than a dozen works by Shakespeare, among them The Tempest and As You Like It.

Poetry
Carneiro is the author of several poetry books:
 Em busca do Sete-Estrelo 
 Verão vagabundo 
 Piquenique em Xanadu (winner of the Lei Sarney award for best book of the year) 
 Pandemônio 
 Folias metafísicas 
 Por mares nunca dantes 
 Lira dos cinquent’anos
 Balada do impostor

With Carlito Azevedo, he released Sonhos da insônia, consisting of translations of Shakespeare's sonnets. He also published, in prose, the books Vinícius de Moraes: a fala da paixão and Leblon: a crônica dos anos loucos.

In 2011, he received the International Emmy Award, for the adaptation of O astro, written in the previous year, in partnership with Alcides Nogueira. Two years later, in 2013, he published translations of poems, fragments and scenes by Shakespeare, organized in partnership with Ana Paula Pedro. The book was among the finalists of the Jabuti Award. In 2014, he wrote, for Juca de Oliveira, a solo adaptation of Shakespeare's King Lear''. That same year, 27 of his poems, translated into English by Charles Perrone, were published by Machado de Assis Magazine, published by the National Library.

He is the sixth occupant of Chair 24 of the Brazilian Academy of Letters, to which he was elected on October 27, 2016, in succession to Sábato Magaldi. He wasreceived on March 31, 2017 by academician Antonio Carlos Secchin.

References

Brazilian poets
Living people
People from Belo Horizonte
Year of birth missing (living people)